Abdul Hamid (born 7 July 1942) is a Pakistani field hockey player who won the silver medal in 1964 Summer Olympics. Again, he won the Silver medal at the 1966 Asian Games.

References

External links
 

1942 births
Living people
Pakistani male field hockey players
Olympic field hockey players of Pakistan
Olympic silver medalists for Pakistan
Olympic medalists in field hockey
Medalists at the 1964 Summer Olympics
Field hockey players at the 1964 Summer Olympics
Asian Games medalists in field hockey
Field hockey players at the 1966 Asian Games
Asian Games silver medalists for Pakistan
Medalists at the 1966 Asian Games
20th-century Pakistani people